Amrutha Srinivasan is an Indian actress who has appeared in Tamil-language films. She is known for her role in the web series Kallachirippu.

Career 
Amrutha Srinivasan made her lead film debut in Aviyal playing the only female protagonist in the film. In 2017, she made her Telugu debut with Mental Madhilo in which she portrayed one of the lead actresses  before playing one of the leads in the web series Livin'. She later starred in the lead role in the Tamil web series Kallachirippu, for which she garnered acclaim. Regarding her role in the web series, India Today stated that "For once, the heroine isn't a self-sacrificing fantasy. She puts herself and her life first and thinks and behaves like an actual woman." She starred in Dev (2019) as Karthi's friend.

Personal life 

Amrutha Srinivasan married Karthik Kumar on 13 December 2021.

Filmography

Films 
All films are in Tamil, unless otherwise noted.

Web series 

Music videos
Kaalai Pozhudhil

References

External links 
 

Indian film actresses
Tamil actresses
Living people
Actresses in Tamil cinema
Actresses in Telugu cinema
21st-century Indian actresses
1993 births